The Belgian Quarter is an inner city district of Cologne, Germany. The name is derived from street names in the vicinity, referring to Belgian provinces or cities. 

In the northern part of the Quarter, street names such as Goebenstraße, Werderstraße, Moltkestraße and Spichernstraße celebrate the leaders and victories of Prussia in the Franco-Prussian War of 1870–1871 which brought down the Second French Empire and led to the creation of a new German Empire.

At the heart of the Belgian Quarter is the Brüsseler Platz, or Brussels Square, dominated by the neo-Romanesque St Michael's Church, built between 1902 and 1906. On warm summer nights the square can fill with hundreds of young people having fun, keeping residents from their sleep.

With a wide variety of cuisine, this Veedel (the local language term for quarter) of Cologne is now considered fashionable, and in the July 2010 issue of the lifestyle magazine Prinz it was named as the part of the city most worth living in. The publication's web site continues to praise it as an "upmarket residential district and meeting place for the creative arts". The TV show NightWash was set in a laundrette in the district for years.

References

Boroughs and quarters of Cologne
Innenstadt, Cologne